The 1972–73 Macedonian Republic League was the 29th since its establishment. FK Rabotnichki won their 8th  championship title.

Participating teams

Final table

External links
SportSport.ba
Football Federation of Macedonia 

Macedonian Football League seasons
Yugo
3